Oxychilus camelinus is a species of small air-breathing land snail, a terrestrial pulmonate gastropod mollusk in the family Oxychilidae, the glass snails.

Description
This species was described under the name Helix camelina from today's Lebanon by Jules René Bourguignat in 1852.

The shape of the shell is almost flat, and the color is light horn. The shell has up to almost 6 whorls, which slowly increase. The last whorl is not much wider than the previous whorl, and is flat on the lower side. The suture is deep. The shell has distinct radial growth lines. The umbilicus is narrow and 1/8 of the shell diameter. The aperture is obliquely depressed.

The width of the shell is 7.1–11 mm and the height of the shell is 4.0-4.5 mm. The width of the last whorl is 1.9-2.0 mm; the width of the umbilicus is 0.7-1.1 mm.

The color of the tentacles, head and neck is light-grey. The color is the sole is white-yellow.

Balcanodiscus frywaldskyanus is a similar species.

Distribution
This species occurs in countries including:
 Lebanon - the type locality is near Baalbek in Lebanon (in Latin: "prope Heliopolim (Baalbek)").
 Israel
 Turkey
 Greece
 Cyprus
 Bulgaria - only two localities are known: Rahat Tepe Hill in Plovdiv city, and in Stara Zagora
 Albania

Some scientists consider this species to be non-indigenous to Europe.

Ecology 
Oxychilus camelinus is a synanthropic species which inhabits dry and rocky habitats, often gardens.

After copulation, snails were observed to lay up to a total of 8 eggs, in groups of 1-4 eggs. The size of the eggs was 1.7 mm.

Oxychilus camelinus feeds on green plant matter and on detritus. These snails can be fed in captivity using cucumber, aquarium fish food, and pork meat.

References

External links

Oxychilus
Gastropods described in 1852